Marion Wallace Dunlop (22 December 1864 – 12 September 1942) was a Scottish artist and author. She was the first and one of the most well known British suffragettes to go on hunger strike, on 5 July 1909, after being arrested in July 1909 for militancy. She said she would not take any food unless she was treated as a political prisoner instead of as a common criminal. Wallace Dunlop's mode of protest influenced suffragettes after her and other leaders like M. K. Gandhi and James Connolly, who also used fasting to protest British rule. She was at the centre of the Women's Social and Political Union and designed processions and banners for them.

Biography

Wallace Dunlop was born at Leys Castle, Inverness, Scotland, on 22 December 1864, the daughter of Robert Henry Wallace Dunlop and his second wife, Lucy Wallace Dunlop (née Dowson; 1836–1914). Although commonly believed to have studied at the Slade School of Fine Art in London, there is no official record of Wallace Dunlop having attended school there. Her paintings were displayed at the Royal Academy in 1903, 1905 and 1906. In 1899, she illustrated Fairies, Elves, and Flower Babies and The Magic Fruit Garden in art-nouveau style.

Wallace Dunlop was a vegetarian and joined the Theosophical Society in 1911. She resigned in 1913.

Suffragism 
Wallace Dunlop became an active member of the Women's Social and Political Union (WSPU) and was first arrested in 1908 for obstruction at the House of Commons along with others like Ada Flatman and again in 1908 for leading a group of women in a march. In 1909 she was arrested a third time, in this case for stenciling a passage from the Bill of Rights on a wall of the House of Commons which read, "It is the right of the subject to petition the King, and all commitments and prosecutions for such petitioning are illegal." It was upon being arrested for this offense on 2 July 1909 that she commenced her first hunger strike.

Hunger strikes 
There was never any suggestion that anyone advised or recommended that Wallace Dunlop go on a hunger strike, and all indications are that it was her idea. However, shortly after word got out, hunger-striking became standard suffragette practice. Christabel Pankhurst later reported: "Miss Wallace Dunlop, taking counsel with no one and acting entirely on her own initiative, sent to the Home Secretary, Mr. Gladstone, as soon as she entered Holloway Prison, an application to be placed in the first division as befitted one charged with a political offence. She announced that she would eat no food until this right was conceded." Mrs. Pethick-Lawrence noted that Wallace Dunlop had found a "new way of insisting upon the proper status of political prisoners, and had the resourcefulness and energy in the face of difficulties that marked the true suffragette".

91 hours 
Wallace Dunlop endured 91 hours of fasting before she was released on 8 July 1909 the grounds of ill health. Hunger striking was her idea and after her success it became official WSPU policy. As a result, in September 1909, the British Government introduced force feeding in prisons. Along with other suffragettes who were imprisoned and went on hunger strikes, Wallace Dunlop was given a Hunger Strike Medal by WSPU.

Death
Wallace Dunlop was a pallbearer when Emmeline Pankhurst died in 1928. She then took on the task of caring for Mary, who was Pankhurst's adopted daughter. Wallace Dunlop died on 12 September 1942 at Mount Alvernia Nursing Home in Guildford.

Gallery

See also
 Women's suffrage in the United Kingdom

References

External links
  Detailed bio of Marion Wallace Dunlop's life.

1864 births
1942 deaths
19th-century Scottish women artists
20th-century Scottish women artists
Alumni of the Slade School of Fine Art
British women activists
Eagle House suffragettes
Fasting advocates
Hunger Strike Medal recipients
People from Ealing
People from Inverness
Scottish suffragettes
Victorian women writers